The Terascale Open-source Resource and Queue Manager (TORQUE) is a distributed resource manager providing control over batch jobs and distributed compute nodes. TORQUE can integrate with the non-commercial Maui Cluster Scheduler or the commercial Moab Workload Manager to improve overall utilization, scheduling and administration on a cluster.

The TORQUE community has extended the original Portable Batch System (PBS) to extend scalability, fault tolerance, and functionality. Contributors include NCSA, OSC, USC, the US DOE, Sandia, PNNL, UB, TeraGrid, and other HPC organizations. As of June 2018, TORQUE is no longer open-source even though previously it was described by its developers as open-source software, using the OpenPBS version 2.3 license and as non-free software by the Debian Free Software Guidelines due to license issues.

Feature set
TORQUE provides enhancements over standard OpenPBS in the following areas:

 Fault Tolerance
 Additional failure conditions checked/handled
 Node health check script support
 Scheduling Interface
 Extended query interface providing the scheduler with additional and more accurate information
 Extended control interface allowing the scheduler increased control over job behavior and attributes
 Allows the collection of statistics for completed jobs
 Scalability
 Significantly improved server to worker nodes' Machine Oriented Mini-server (MOM) communication model
 Ability to handle larger clusters (over 15 TF/2,500 processors)
 Ability to handle larger jobs (over 2000 processors)
 Ability to support larger server messages
 Usability
 Extensive logging additions
 More human readable logging (i.e. no more "error 15038 on command 42")

See also
 

 Beowulf cluster
 HTCondor
 Maui Cluster Scheduler
 Open Source Cluster Application Resources (OSCAR)
 Portable Batch System
 Slurm Workload Manager
 Univa Grid Engine

References

External links
 TORQUE Resource Manager Documentation
 OpenPBS home page
 OpenPBS Open Source Project
 openpbs GitHub

Computational science
Job scheduling